The 1969–70 ABA season was the third season of the American Basketball Association.  Prior to the start of the season, the Minnesota Pipers moved back to Pittsburgh, the Oakland Oaks moved to Washington, D.C. and became the Washington Caps and the Houston Mavericks moved to North Carolina and became the Carolina Cougars.  For the regular-season, the schedule was increased from 78 to 84 games per team.  The season ended with the Indiana Pacers capturing their first ABA Championship.

Spencer Haywood, a rookie from the University of Detroit, led the ABA in scoring (30.0 ppg) and rebounding (19.5 rpg) for the Denver Rockets.  Haywood was professional basketball's first "hardship case", leaving college after his sophomore season.  The NBA prohibited him from declaring for its draft, and he signed with the Rockets instead, leading them to the Western Division championship.

Final standings

Eastern Division

Western Division

Asterisk (*) denotes playoff team

Bold – ABA Champions

Playoffs

Awards and honors

 ABA Most Valuable Player Award: Spencer Haywood, Denver Rockets
 Rookie of the Year: Spencer Haywood, Denver Rockets
 Coach of the Year: Bill Sharman, Los Angeles Stars & Joe Belmont, Denver Rockets
 Playoffs MVP: Roger Brown, Indiana Pacers
 All-Star Game MVP: Spencer Haywood, Denver Rockets
All-ABA First Team 
 Rick Barry, Washington Caps (2nd selection)
 Spencer Haywood, Denver Rockets
 Mel Daniels, Indiana Pacers (3rd selection)
 Bob Verga, Carolina Cougars
 Larry Jones, Denver Rockets (3rd selection)
All-ABA Second Team
 Roger Brown, Indiana Pacers (2nd selection)
 Bob Netolicky, Indiana Pacers
 Red Robbins, Indiana Pacers (2nd selection)
 Louie Dampier, Kentucky Colonels (3rd selection)
 Donnie Freeman, Miami Floridians (2nd selection)
All-ABA Rookie Team
 Mike Barrett, Washington Caps
 John Brisker, Pittsburgh Pipers
 Mack Calvin, Los Angeles Stars
 Spencer Haywood, Denver Rockets
 Willie Wise, Los Angeles Stars

Finals

References

 
ABA